Damares Regina Alves (born 11 September 1964) is a Brazilian lawyer and evangelical pastor. She was the Minister of Women, Families and Human Rights during the Presidency of Jair Bolsonaro from 2019 to 2022. She is the second female minister appointed to the new government as of December 2018. In the 2022 election, Damares was elected Senator for the Federal District.

Damares defends the prohibition of abortion after rape and in risk pregnancies, women trafficking, suicide, the prohibition of juvenile self-harming and drug consumption, such as, from her perspective, taking hormone blockers. Alves is engaged directly in the preparation of youth for the Fourth Industrial Revolution and intended to consolidate an agenda between different ministries of the Federal Government capable of integrating programs, policies, projects and initiatives under the same, articulated perspective of impact—modernizing education.

Biography 
Born in Paraná, Damares migrated to the northeast with her family. As a child, she lived in Bahia, in Alagoas and Sergipe. She also lived in São Carlos in the São Paulo state. These moves are strictly linked to her father's profession, the pastor Henrique Alves Sobrinho, from the "Quadrangular" Gospel Church—Foursquare Gospel Church. Damares also became a pastor herself.

She graduated in Law in the now extinct , an institution that had its credentials revoked by the Ministry of Education (MEC) in 2011 and is forbidden to make entrance exams since 2012.

In São Carlos, she worked for the Municipal Secretary of Tourism, serving in the old COMTUR (Municipal Commission of Tourism), during the government of the mayor Vadinho de Guzzi. In 1999, shortly before obtaining her registration in the state bar exam, the Order of Attorneys of São Paulo (OAB-SP, in a São Carlos subsection), she became junior parliamentarian auxiliary in Brasília.

She was a pastor of Foursquare Gospel Church and also of the Baptist Church of Lagoinha, in Belo Horizonte.

Damares was coordinator of the educational project of Proteger Program, organization created by Guilherme Zanina Schelb, regional attorney of the Republic in the Federal District and member of the National Association of Evangelical Jurists (organization of which Damares was Director of Parliamentary Affairs). The project's creator was known for defending the project nicknamed "" (School Without [Political] Party).

In 1999, Damares moved to Brasília to work as a parliamentary assistant in the office of deputy Joshua Bengtson (PTB-PA), also pastor of the Church of the Foursquare Gospel. She also worked for federal deputy Arolde de Oliveira (PSD), a senator elected by Rio de Janeiro in 2018, and whose success at the polls in October was due, in large part, to the support of the so-called "Bolsonaro clan." She also served as a parliamentary auxiliary in Senator Magno Malta's office, prior to the bond with the senator in favor of the Espírito Santo state. He was chief of cabinet of another exponent of the Neopentecostal bench in the Chamber of Deputies, the federal deputy João Campos de Araújo (PRB).

She worked as legal adviser in the National Congress for more than 20 years, before her appointment by Bolsonaro to the Ministry of Women, Families and Human Rights.

From 2013, during a lecture at a church in Mato Grosso do Sul, Damares has presented herself as a lawyer and master in education, constitutional law and family law, although she never received a master's degree and her schooling is limited to a Law degree. In the occasion, Damares was criticizing a Dutch custom. When confronted about her lack of credentials, she argued saying she was a Christian master (or "teacher," as in most of the versions), as in Ephesians 4:11 "And it is he who gifted some to be apostles, others to be prophets, others to be evangelists, and still others to be pastors and teachers".

Background 
Alves had been a legal adviser in the National Congress for more than 20 years prior to her appointment by Bolsonaro.

As Minister of Women, Families and Human Rights of Brazil, she, at the United Nations 63rd Session of the Commission on the Status of Women in March 2019, affirmed that the combatting violence against women is a definite goal of the government, as well as the growth of girls.

Personal views and activism
Deeply religious, she has claimed to have seen a vision of Jesus atop a guava tree, and has stated that "the State is secular, but this minister is extremely Christian, and because of that, she believes in God's design."

Alves has indicated that religious views should take greater prominence in national politics. In 2016 journalists reported that she had addressed worshippers in an Evangelical church telling them, "It is time for the church to tell the nation that we have come ... It is time for the church to govern."
   
She also disclosed that she is a supporter of "traditional" gender roles within society and an opponent of what she regards as "ideological indoctrination," suggesting that girls should be regarded as "princesses" who wear pink and boys as little "princes" who wear blue. In a viral video, she claimed that Elsa from Disney's Frozen must be a lesbian because the princess ends up alone in a castle of ice. Alves says that "women are made to be mothers."

She also supports prohibiting abortion in cases of rape or incest (only supporting it on cases where the mother's or baby's life/health is threatened) and harsher punishments on women trafficking and rape. She also previously defended projects to fight juvenile self-harmingand suicide as well as juvenile drug consumption (which includes, in her opinion, hormone blockers). 

Alves is a vocal critic of the annual carnival festival in Brazil, saying that "carnival parties, unfortunately, are an affront and a disrespect to the Christian faith." Alves promised to pass a bill protecting evangelicals who protest at the carnival.

Personal life
She has an adoptive daughter of Kamayurá indigenous origin, born in 1998 in Xingu Indigenous Park. Some journalists of Época Magazine in Brazil went to the tribe, who claim the child was kidnapped from them; they say she was lured to Brasilia by Damares and an associate named Márcia Suzuki, who presented themselves as missionaries, under the pretense of taking her to the city for dental treatment. Alves and her adopted daughter deny it, while Damares claims she saved her from malnutrition and possible infanticide.

References

External links

1964 births
Living people
Evangelical pastors
Brazilian evangelicals
Brazilian anti-abortion activists
Brazilian anti-communists
Female critics of feminism
People from Paranaguá
Government ministers of Brazil
Women government ministers of Brazil
Republicans (Brazil) politicians